Jani Bäckman (born 20 March 1988) is a Finnish football player currently playing for HIFK.

Career
Bäckman began his career with IF Sibbo-Vargarna and joined Klubi-04 in 2004. He played his one and only game with the team in Ykkönen against RoPS on 28 April 2007. Bäckman was then transferred to HJK in 2006 and played for their youth side. In January 2007, he was promoted to play with the club’s senior team.

After one year with HJK and only one professional game for the club in the Finnish Cup, Bäckman sealed a move to FC Honka. He played 16 games for the club, from which eleven were in the Veikkausliiga.

Later, Bäckman was loaned out by FC Honka to FC Haka, from 12 March 2009 to August 2009.

On 4 November 2009, FF Jaro signed Bäckman for free. He signed a one-year contract with the club including an option to extend for another year.

On 1 March 2017, Bäckman had to play as a goalkeeper in a Finnish Cup match against HJK after HIFK goalkeeper Carljohan Eriksson was sent off in the 86th minute causing a penalty kick. Bäckman saved the penalty.

References

External links

 

1988 births
Living people
Finnish footballers
Veikkausliiga players
Helsingin Jalkapalloklubi players
FC Honka players
FF Jaro players
FC Lahti players
Klubi 04 players
HIFK Fotboll players
Association football defenders